Moosrambagh also Moosa Ram Bagh is an old suburb of Hyderabad, Telangana, India. It is named after the French military commander Monsieur Raymond who served the Nizams during the 18th century. His tomb Raymond's Tomb is located near Asman Garh Palace. The locality of "Moosa-Ram-Bagh" is named after him. Wherein, Bagh refers to "a Garden" as the area was once covered by huge greenery.

History
Raymond became a close friend of the second Asaf Jah, Nizam Ali Khan. Raymond was not only held in high esteem by the 2nd Nizam, but had also won the love and trust of the local people. He made himself popular through his kindness, bravery and contribution to Hyderabad. To the Muslims, he was Musa Rahim, and to the Hindus, he was Musa Ram.

George Bruce Malleson said that 
"No European of mark who followed him in India, ever succeeded in gaining to such an extent the love, the esteem, the admiration of the natives of the country."

Commercial area
Moosrambagh has many shops catering to all needs of its residents. The popular Hyderabadi restaurants Capital (aka Shaam) and Bawarchi are located here. The suburb also has Doordarshan's TV tower.

Transport
The state-owned TSRTC runs the city bus service, connecting to all the major centres of the city. There is also a Hyderabad metro station, connecting it to other parts of city.

See also
Michel Joachim Marie Raymond

References

Neighbourhoods in Hyderabad, India
Establishments in Hyderabad State
Municipal wards of Hyderabad, India